Busoga (Lusoga: Obwakyabazinga bwa Busoga) is a kingdom and one of four constitutional monarchies in present-day Uganda. The kingdom is a cultural institution which promotes popular participation and unity among the people of the region through development programs to improve their standard of living. Busoga strives for a united people who have economic, social and cultural prosperity and assists the Kyabazinga.

Busoga means "Land of the Soga", and is the kingdom of the 11 principalities of the Basoga or Soga (singular Musoga) people. Its capital is Bugembe, near Jinja (Uganda's second-largest city, after Kampala). Busoga comprises eleven districts: Kamuli, Iganga, Bugiri, Mayuge, Jinja, Luuka,  and the new districts of Bugweri, Buyende, Kaliro,Namutumba  and Namayingo District. Each district is headed by an elected chairperson or a Local Council Five, and municipalities are headed by an elected mayor. Jinja is the industrial and economic hub of Busoga. Busoga is bordered on the north by shallow Lake Kyoga (separating it from Lango), on the west by the Victoria Nile (separating it from Buganda), on the south by Lake Victoria (separating it from Tanzania and Kenya) and on the east by the Mpologoma River (separating it from smaller tribal groups such as the Adhola, Bugwere and Bugisu). It also includes several islands in Lake Victoria, such as Buvuma Island.

The Kyabazinga 

Busoga is ruled by the Isebantu Kyabazinga, who is currently William Kadhumbula Gabula Nadiope IV, the Gabula of Bugabula, and grandson to Wilberforce Kadhumbula Nadiope, former vice president and also Kyabazinga of Busoga Kingdom. In 1995, the government restored monarchies in Uganda in Article 246(1) of the constitution of Uganda. On 11 February 1996, Henry Wako Muloki was reinstated as Kyabazinga Isebantu of Busoga. He served until 1 September 2008, when he died of esophageal cancer at the Mulago National Referral Hospital in Kampala at age 87. In a condolence message, Ugandan president Yoweri Museveni described Muloki as "a great cultural leader and father" who was "generous and kind". Museveni noted that since his re-installation, Muloki was a unifying factor in Busoga: "The Government has had the privilege of working with Isebantu Muloki in developing our nation". Referring to the Kyabazinga as "a strong pillar", the president said that although Busoga was one of the youngest kingdoms, under Muloki's leadership it had become strong: "Uganda mourns not only one of her esteemed traditional leaders but a national who put development and the welfare of the people of Busoga at the helm of his reign". Muloki's achievements included programs for youth, the elderly, and the poor and the education of girls. Although the Royal Chiefs of Busoga at first elected Edward Columbus Wambuzi, Muloki's son, as Kyabazinga of Busoga, the election was contested due to lack of quorum (at least eight chiefs) and thus electing later Gabula Nadiope IV with ten out of eleven chiefs and was crowned on 13 September 2014.

History

Early contact with European explorers 

Busoga's written history began in 1862. On 28 July Royal Geographical Society explorer John Hanning Speke arrived at Ripon Falls (near Jinja, where the Victoria Nile flows from Lake Victoria and begins its descent to Egypt. Since Speke's route (inland from the East African coast) took him around the southern end of Lake Victoria, he approached Busoga from the west (through Buganda). Having reached his goal (the source of the Nile), he turned northward and followed the river downstream without exploring Busoga. He records, however, being told that Usoga (Swahili for Busoga) was an island (it is bordered on all four sides by water).

Demographics
During the 19th century, one of the main routes along which Europeans travelled from the coast to Buganda passed through southern Busoga. Speke, James Grant, Gerald Portal, Frederick Lugard, J. R. Macdonald and Bishop Tucket noted that Busoga had plentiful food and was densely populated. However, between 1898–99 and 1900–01 the first cases of sleeping sickness were reported.

In 1906, orders were issued to evacuate the region. Despite attempts to clear the area, the epidemic continued until 1910. As a result, most of the densely populated parts of Busoga (with an original population of over 200,000) were depopulated within ten years. Lubas Palace at Bukaleba and the European fruit mission collapsed, and survivors were relocated to other parts of Busoga. Southern Busoga, about one-third of the kingdom's area, was depopulated by 1910. During the 1920s and 1930s, some evacuees who survived the epidemic began to return to their original land. In 1940 a new outbreak appeared in the area, and only in 1956 did resettlement (promoted by the government) begin again.

The result of the epidemic was that southern Busoga, its most densely populated area, was virtually uninhabited. Other areas affected by sleeping sickness, including eastern Bukooli and Busiki, were depopulated as well. Famines also triggered substantial population movements. Parts of northeastern Busoga and the adjacent Bukandi district (across the Mpologoma River) experienced famines in [1907, 1908, 1917, 1918|1898–1900, 1907, 1908, 1917, 1918] and 1944. Populations in these areas shrank; many people were killed by the famines, and survivors moved to other areas for safety.

The effects of these movements were apparent in the growth in population of central and peri-urban Busoga. Many Basoga left Busoga during this period for other districts.

Economics 

During the pre-colonial era, people left their traditional lands and state structures disappeared. A number of clans and chiefdoms were decimated by famine and epidemics, and people migrated to Busoga with the traditions and cultures of other lands. A need for security fueled population growth in urban and peri-urban areas of Busoga such as Jinja, Iganga, Kamuli, Kaliro, Bugiri and their surrounding areas

From 1920 to the 1970s, Jinja (Busoga's capital) gained economic importance due to cotton production and the completion of the Uganda Railway and the Owen Falls Dam. The town became an agri-industrial centre with factories, cottage industries and a well-developed infrastructure. People from rural Busoga came to work in the factories and in domestic work. Among the newcomers were Asian families. Services such as piped water, electricity, roads, hospitals and schools were improved to serve the growing population. Farmers were assured of markets in the towns, grew cash and food crops such as cotton, coffee, bananas, potatoes, cassava, fruits and vegetables. The standard of living improved; the kingdom's revenue increased, enabling it to build more infrastructure. Subsistence farming diminished, with the population turning to economic production demanded by the Europeans.

By the time of independence in 1962, Busoga was one of the most prosperous regions in Uganda. Jinja was home to 70 percent of Uganda's industries and the Nalubaale Power Station (Owen Falls Dam), which supplies electricity to Uganda and parts of Kenya and Tanzania. Jinja was also home to the majority of Uganda's Asian population. These Ugandan Asians, brought to Uganda from the Indian sub-continent by the British during the Raj, helped establish Jinja as one of East Africa's largest commercial centres.

Politics 

Around the turn of the 16th century, the Baisengobi clan from Bunyoro gained power. Mukama Namutukula of the royal Babiito family of Bunyoro is said to have left Bunyoro during the 16th century as part of the kingdom's expansion policy, travelling east across Lake Kyoga with his wife Nawudo, a few servants, arms and a dog and landing at Iyingo in northern Busoga (in the present-day Kamuli District).

Mukama, who enjoyed hunting, was taken with the land. He engaged in metalworking: blacksmithing and making hoes, iron utensils and spears. Of Mukama's children five boys survived, and when he returned to Bunyoro he gave them land to oversee. His firstborn, Wakoli, received Bukooli; Zibondo received Bulamogi, Ngobi Kigulu, Tabingwa Luuka, and the youngest son, Kitimbo, received Bugabula. These areas later became administrative and cultural centers in Busoga. When Mukama did not return, his sons regarded themselves as the legitimate rulers of their respective areas. They presided over their dominions, employing governing methods and cultural rituals similar to those in Bunyoro. This political and cultural arrangement in Busoga continued until the late 19th century, when the colonialists persuaded its rulers to organize a federation. The federation was governed by a Lukiiko.

Although Busoga is called a "kingdom", it did not have a central ruler before 1906, unlike its western neighbor Buganda. In 1906, a central administrator -- later a King --  was installed at the behest of the British. Before this, the Basoga were organized in semi-autonomous chiefdoms influenced by Bunyoro and, later, Buganda. Some of the chiefs were appointed by the Kabaka, and, before the ascendancy of Buganda as the region’s dominant power, by the Omukama of Bunyoro.

Busoga's first native King was the chief of Bugabula, Yosia Nadiope. Nadiope died in 1913 and was, in 1919, succeeded by the chief of Bulamogi, Ezekiel Tenywa Wako, who had both support of the colonialist British support and an administrative background, in addition to his being educated at the prestigious Kings' College Budo. Gideon Obodha of Kigulu (another contender for the post) was unfamiliar with the British system, and William Wilberforce Nadiope Kadhumbula of Bugabula was an infant whose regent (Mwami Mutekanga) was ineligible as a mukoopi (a commoner). In 1918-19, the title of Isebantu Kyabazinga was created and Wako took the throne.  In 1925 Wako became a member of the Uganda Kings Council, consisting of the Kyabazinga of Busoga, the Kabaka of Buganda, the Omukamas of Bunyoro and Toro and the Omugabe of Ankole.

On 11 February 1939 Owekitibwa Ezekerial Tenywa Wako, father of the last Kyabazinga of Busoga Henry Wako Muloki and the Zibondo of Bulamogi, was installed as the first Kyabazinga of Busoga (a title he held until his 1949 retirement). By Wako's retirement, the Lukiiko had expanded to include elected representatives (two from each of Busoga's 55 sub-counties).

When Wako retired the Busoga Lukiiko resolved that the Kyabazinga should be elected from the five lineages of Baise Ngobi (Ababiito), hereditary rulers traditionally believed to have been the five sons of the Omukama of Bunyoro who migrated to Busoga from Bunyoro. This method of election was used for subsequent elections, beginning in 1949 when Owekitibwa Chief William Wilberforce Nadiope Kadhumbula of Bugabula was elected. He served for two terms of three years each, followed by Henry Wako Muloki (who also served two terms). In 1957, the title Inhebantu of Busoga was introduced for the wife of the Kyabazinga (or Isebantu).

When monarchies were abolished in 1966, the Kyabazinga was dethroned. Idi Amin expelled the Asians from Uganda in 1972, and Jinja suffered socially and economically. The government of Yoweri Museveni has tried to encourage them to return. The Asian influence remains, particularly in architecture and street names.

In 1995, the government restored monarchies in Uganda. On 11 February, Henry Wako Muloki was reinstated as Kyabazinga according to Kisogan tradition. Unlike most monarchs, the Kyabazinga has no heir or crown prince but is succeeded by a chief elected by the Lukiiko and the Royal Council.

Past Kyabazingas 
Three past Kyabazingas have presided over the federated state of Busoga since 1939: Ezekiel Tenywa Wako, Yosia Nadiope and William Wilberforce Nadiope Kadhumbula. Kadhumbula waged an emizindula (war on theft) and ended a British practice in the fight against smallpox (kawumpuli) where residents were required to publicly supply rat tails for counting to prove that they had killed the rats. His opposition brought him into conflict with the British; he was exiled to Bunyoro, later leading the Basoga into the Second World War.

Kadhumbula played an important role in Uganda's independence struggle; he was also the first vice-president of independent Uganda and chairman of the Uganda People's Congress (UPC).
Kadhumbula built infrastructure such as roads, hospitals and government centres, and mobilised the Basoga for agriculture. Balangira High School later became Busoga College.

Political structure 
The Busoga Royal Council is composed of the 11 traditional leaders of Busoga: the heads of the five royal families and the six tribal chiefs.

The Katukiro (Prime Minister) of Busoga is Joseph Muvawala Nsekere . The office of the Katukiro in the Kingdom is an important and a vital one. The Katukiro is the head of the kingdom's government, and the spokesperson for the Kyabazinga and the kingdom.

Attractions and historic sites

Kagulu Rock
This was the first settlement area for the Bunyoro Basoga, led by Mukama. Although Kagulu's cultural influence is widespread, its visible landmark is Kagulu Rock. The rock is between two roads which fork at its foot, leading to Gwaya and Iyingo. The rock has a clear view of almost all Busoga, with steps making it easier for visitors to reach the top. Kagulu Rock has been for a long time a major adventure and tourist attraction in Eastern Uganda. Previously, it had caught the curious eyes of the foreign NGO workers in the area, but with the advent of the local initiative to promote the site, Kagulu Rock is now a big attraction to all. Kagulu Rock, is a rocky prominence that rises 10,000 feet (3,048 m), above sea level.

Budhumbula shrine and palace 
Two kilometers from Kamuli on the Kamuli-Jinja road, the site includes a shrine and the residence of former Kyabazinga William Wilberforce Kadhumbula Nadiope (who died in 1976). The marble-covered shrine contains the graves of other members of the royal family, including Nadiope's father and mother (Yosia Nadiope and Nasikombi). Other graves in the shrine are those of his son, former Uganda government minister Wilson Nadiope (who died in 1991), and  his mother, Yuliya Babirye Nadiope (who died in 2004). The main palace residence is a legacy of the British colonial government, which donated it in 1914.

Source of the Nile 

The source of the Nile, the world's second-longest river, at Lake Victoria was discovered by John Speke and is an internationally known attraction.

Bujjagali Falls 

This former waterfall was submerged in November 2011 by the Bujagali Dam.

Lake Victoria 

Southern Busoga is bordered by Lake Victoria, whose coastline runs from Jinja east to the Kenyan border.

Bishop James Hannington Shrine 
The place where Bishop James Hannington and 48 of his helpers are believed to have been murdered in 1885.

Twegaite
This nonprofit cultural organization is headquartered in Boston. Twegaite's main objective is to revitalize Busoga's economy, health and education.

See also 
 Lusoga - Lusoga language

References

Sources
 Fallers, Margaret Chave (1960) The Eastern Lacustrine Bantu (Ganda and Soga). Ethnographic survey of Africa: East central Africa, Vol 11. London: International African Institute.
 Cohen, David William (1970). A survey of interlacustrine chronology. The Journal of African History, 1970, 11, 2, 177-202.
 Cohen, David William (1986). Towards a reconstructed past : Historical texts from Busoga, Uganda. (Fontes historiae africanae). Oxford: Oxford University Press.
Fallers, Lloyd A. (1965) Bantu Bureaucracy - A Century of Political evolution among the Basoga of Uganda. Phoenix Books, The University of Chicago.

External links 
 Busoga University, formerly Busoga College Mwiri
 Busoga College Mwiri
 Busoga clans and other resources

 
Sub-regions of Uganda
Ugandan monarchies
Ethnic groups in Uganda
Non-sovereign monarchy